Henry Palmer (September 1821 - 19 July 1916) was a member of the Queensland Legislative Assembly.

Biography
Palmer was born at Birr, King's County, Ireland. After he arrived in Australia he took up pastoral pursuits in Victoria and became a drover in Queensland. In 1856 he established a store and then was a director of the Maryborough Sugar Company.

Palmer was married to Hannah Foster and together had three sons and three daughters. Palmer died in July 1916 and his funeral proceeded from his former residence in Kent Street to the Maryborough Cemetery.

Palmer's younger brother John Palmer was the first mayor of Rockhampton. Their brother Richard Palmer had established the first general merchant store in Rockhampton in 1856, which John Palmer ultimately took over in 1858.

Public career
Palmer was a councillor on the Maryborough Shire Council and in 1861 was the town's Mayor. He then contested the seat of Maryborough at the 1873 Queensland colonial election but lost to Berkeley Moreton. He then won the 1880 by-election that was brought on by the resignation of John Douglas, defeating John Hurley and William Keith.

He stood for re-election at the 1883 Queensland colonial election but was defeated by John Hurley and Richard Sheridan.

References

Members of the Queensland Legislative Assembly
Mayors of places in Queensland
People from Birr, County Offaly
1821 births
1916 deaths